Dergachyov or Dergachev (from дергать meaning to pull) is a Russian masculine surname, its feminine counterpart is Dergachyova or Dergacheva. It may refer to
Alexander Dergachyov (born 1996), Russian ice hockey player
Nikolai Dergachyov (born 1994), Russian association football forward
Vladimir Dergachev (born 1945), Ukrainian expert in geopolitics
Yelena Dergachyova (born 1995), Russian ice hockey forward

Russian-language surnames